Leanne Ganney (born 4 October 1991) is an English ice hockey player, currently serving as captain of SDE Hockey in the Swedish Women's Hockey League (SDHL) and the national team of Great Britain (Team GB).

Playing career   

At the age of 12, Ganney began playing with the Guildford Lightning in the highest division of English women's hockey. She would play with Guildford for four years, before switching to the Bracknell Queen Bees. 

In 2017, Ganney signed with SDE in Sweden. In her first season, she served as an assistant captain, and was named captain in 2018. In 2020, the team made the playoffs for the first time, as she put up 17 points in 36 games.

International 

Ganney has made over 40 appearances with the British senior team, for whom she has served as captain since 2015. She has won three IIHF World Women's Championship Division II silver medals and three bronze medals.

Career statistics

References

External links
 

1991 births
Living people
Sportspeople from Basingstoke
British women's ice hockey forwards
SDE Hockey players